Kotte Divisional Secretariat is a  Divisional Secretariat  of Colombo District, of Western Province, Sri Lanka.

The Divisional Secretariat is larger than the Dehiwala, Rathmalana and Moratuwa Divisional Secretariats. It consists of twenty GS divisions, and is bounded by the Kolonnawa and Kaduwela Divisional secretariats to the north and east, the Maharagama and Thimbirigasyaya Divisional Secretariats to the south and west. This area is to be considered as Sri Jayawardenepura Kotte Municipal council area as well.

So that this area is highly urbanised due to some factors like being a main administrative capital, parliament complex and especially suburban area in the Colombo city. It has become highly populated with the developed road network and sufficient infrastructure facilities.

It is very clear the economic system of the area is basically focused on service sector. Accordingly, main professions of major population in the area base on service sector. In addition, clear development can be seen in the industrial sector. People who engage in the agriculture, are in minor population and part-time farmers are more than full-time farmers of that population.

Role performed at DS

References
 Kotte Divisional Secretariat
 https://www.facebook.com/KotteDivisionalSecretary/
 https://twitter.com/ds_kotte
 http://dskotte.blogspot.com/

Divisional Secretariats of Colombo District